Live In Concert 1998 is a 2-disc DVD/CD set by Bootsy Collins and the New Rubber Band. The DVD features Bootsy Collins performing at the North Sea Jazz Festival on July 11, 1998. The concert was originally shown on Dutch television shortly after the performance. The DVD/CD set was released by ABC Entertainment, in conjunction with Charly Films in 2006.

Tracks

Disc One(DVD)

Intro
Ahh...The Name Is Bootsy, Baby
Bootsy? (What's The Name Of This Town?)
Psychoticbumpschool
Keep Dah Funk Alive 4-1995
Party Lick-A-Bles
Funk Express Card
I'm Leavin' U(Gotta Go)
Who-Ya Hey
Bernie Solo
Funkentelechy
One Nation Under A Groove
Flash Light
Roto-Rooter
Bootzilla
Roto-Rooter
Good-N-Nasty
Save What's Mine For Me
I'd Rather Be With You
A Sacred Place (R.I.P.)
Medley: Stretchin' Out/Touch Somebody
Night Of The Thumpasorus Peoples

Disc Two(CD)

Edited audio version of the DVD

Personnel

Bootsy Collins-Space Bass
Bernie Worrell, Greg Fitz-Keyboards
Frankie Kash Waddy-Drums
Garry Shider, Flip Cornett-Guitars
Flip Cornett-Bass
Rick Gardner-Trumpet
Don Bynum-Saxophone
Mudbone Cooper, Henry Benifield, April Woods, Jiffy-Vocals

Bootsy Collins albums
1995 live albums
1995 video albums
Live video albums